Croton setiger is a species of plant known as turkey mullein and dove weed. It is native to most of the western United States and northwest Mexico. It has naturalized elsewhere, including parts of Australia. It is sometimes spelled Croton setigerus and was formerly known as Eremocarpus setigerus.

This is a squat plant with furry, feltlike, hexagon shaped leaves, pale pink green in color. The small green flowers are covered in soft bristles.

Cultivation
Croton setigerus is used as an ornamental plant, its low and rounded form fills a pot.

The foliage is toxic to animals, and the crushed plants were used by Native Americans to stupefy fish and make them easy to catch. When crushed, the leaves have a sweet odor that some find unpleasant.

Despite the plant's toxicity to some species, the seeds are eaten by birds. The common names of the plant come from the affinity of doves and wild turkeys for the seeds.

References

setiger
Flora of North America
Plants used in traditional Native American medicine
Garden plants of North America
Drought-tolerant plants
Bird food plants